William Ivison (5 June 1920 – 12 March 2000) was an English professional association football and rugby league footballer who played in the 1940s and 1950s.

Background
Billy Ivison was born in Hensingham, Cumberland, England, and he died aged 79 in Hensingham, Cumbria, England.

Playing career

International honours
Billy Ivison won caps for England while at Workington Town in 1949 against Wales, and Other Nationalities, in 1951 against Other Nationalities, in 1952 against Other Nationalities,.

Billy Ivison represented Great Britain while at Workington Town in 1952 against France (non-Test matches).

Along with William "Billy" Banks, Edward "Ted" Cahill, Gordon Haynes, Keith Holliday, Robert "Bob" Kelly, John McKeown, George Parsons and Edward "Ted" Slevin, Billy Ivison's only Great Britain appearances came against France prior to 1957, these matches were not considered as Test matches by the Rugby Football League, and consequently caps were not awarded.

County honours
Billy Ivison represented Cumberland while at Workington Town. Billy Ivison played , and scored a try in Cumberland's 5–4 victory over Australia in the 1948–49 Kangaroo tour of Great Britain and France match at the Recreation Ground, Whitehaven on Wednesday 13 October 1948, in front of a crowd of 8,818.

Challenge Cup Final appearances
Billy Ivison played  and won the Lance Todd Trophy in Workington Town's 18–12 victory over Featherstone Rovers in the 1952 Challenge Cup Final during the 1951–52 season at Wembley Stadium, London on Saturday 19 April 1952, in front of a crowd of 72,093, and played  in the 12–21 defeat by Barrow in the 1955 Challenge Cup Final during the 1954–55 season at Wembley Stadium, London on Saturday 30 April 1955, in front of a crowd of 66,513.

Honoured in Workington
Ivison Lane in Workington is named after Billy Ivison.

References

External links
(archived by web.archive.org) » Legends Evening 50s
(archived by web.archive.org) Profile at eraofthebiff.com
(archived by web.archive.org) 'It's about time too'
30 April 1955 Photograph of Workington Town (William Ivison is in the centre of middle row wearing a scrum cap)

1920 births
2000 deaths
Association footballers not categorized by position
British Empire rugby league team players
Cumberland rugby league team players
England national rugby league team players
English footballers
English rugby league players
Gillingham F.C. players
Great Britain national rugby league team players
Lance Todd Trophy winners
Place of death missing
Rugby league locks
Rugby league players from Whitehaven
Footballers from Cumbria
Workington Town players